Emperor Yuan of Jin (276 – 3 January 323), personal name Sima Rui (司馬睿), courtesy name Jingwen (景文), was an emperor of the Jin dynasty and the first emperor of the Eastern Jin.  His reign saw the steady gradual loss of Jin territory in the north, but entrenchment of Jin authority south of the Huai River and east of the Three Gorges. For generations, Jin was not seriously threatened by the Wu Hu kingdoms to the north.

Early career 
Sima Rui was born in 276 in the then Jin capital Luoyang, as the son of Sima Jin the Prince of Langya and his wife Princess Xiahou Guangji. (According to an alternative account at the end of his biography in the Book of Jin, he was actually the prouct of an affair between Princess Xiahou and a minor official from the family of the Cao Wei general, Niu Jin.) His father died in 290, and he became the Prince of Langya. The Book of Jin referred to him as steady and dexterious, personality-wise.

In 304, in the midst of the War of the Eight Princes, Sima Rui participated in Sima Yue the Prince of Donghai's campaign against Sima Ying the Prince of Chengdu as a minor general.  After Sima Ying defeated Sima Yue, Sima Yue executed Sima Rui's uncle Sima Yao the Prince of Dong'an, which caused Sima Rui much fear.  He decided to flee back to his principality Langxie (roughly modern Weifang, Shandong), under counsel of Sima Yue's assistant Wang Dao, whom he befriended during the campaign.  He first tried to head back to Luoyang, but when he was about to cross the Yellow River, he was stopped by guards instructed to stop any nobles or high level officials from crossing (as Sima Ying had ordered such, fearing that nobles would desert him or plot against him).  His own guard Song Dian then arrived and gave him a shove, pretending that they were just construction workers.  The guards then allowed them to cross.  After Sima Rui got to Luoyang, he took his mother Princess Dowager Xiahou and headed to Langxie, where they spent the next few years away from the War of the Eight Princes.

In 307, Sima Yue, who had emerged victorious in the aftermaths of the War of the Eight Princes as the regent for Emperor Huai, under the advice of his wife Princess Pei, commissioned Sima Rui as the military commander of parts of Yang Province (揚州, modern Zhejiang and southern Jiangsu and Anhui) south of the Yangtze River, with his post at Jianye.  Wang Dao became his chief advisor.  As Sima Rui lacked fame, after he arrived in Jianye, few of the powerful local gentlemen would come visit and support him.  Under Wang Dao's counsel, Sima Rui personally visited He Xun and Gu Rong and invited them to serve in his administration.  He and Gu were well regarded by the local population, which eventually began to trust Sima Rui's leadership.  Wang Dao and his cousin, the general Wang Dun, served in key roles, and it was said at the time that the domain was ruled equally by the Simas and the Wangs.《晉書·王敦傳》：帝初鎮江東，威名未著，敦與從弟導等同心翼戴，以隆中興，時人為之語曰：「王與馬，共天下。」〈司馬睿與王導。門閥政治格局的形成〉

After the fall of Luoyang 
In 311, Luoyang fell to Han Zhao forces, and Emperor Huai was captured.  A large number of refugees, fleeing Han Zhao forces, crossed the Yangtze River and arrived in Sima Rui's domain. Under Wang Dao's suggestion, Sima Rui sought out the talented men among them and added them to his administration.  Meanwhile, he began to exercise more imperial power, and began to put all other provinces south of the Huai River under his own control—and, for the next few years, under the command of Wang Dun and other generals such as Tao Kan and Zhou Fang, the agrarian rebels resisting Jin rule in Jing (荊州, modern Hubei) and Xiang (湘州, modern Hunan) Provinces were gradually subjugated.  However, he made no effort to try to send armies north against Han Zhao.  Meanwhile, as his powerful assistants were largely refugees from the north, the native population began to be dissatisfied, and over the next few years there were constant frictions that decreased the effectiveness of Sima Rui's administration.  In 315, members of the powerful Zhou clan intended to start an uprising against him, but the conspiracy was exposed by other members of the clan still loyal to Jin, and the conspiracy did not have a major impact.  In 315, Wang Dun was finally able to suppress the remaining agrarian rebels in the west, and began to show ambitions and act independently of Sima Rui.

In 313, after Emperor Huai was executed by Han Zhao, Sima Ye, a nephew of Emperor Huai, was declared emperor (as Emperor Min) in Chang'an.  Sima Rui was named the Left Prime Minister, a title that he accepted; however, he took no actual actions in aid of the emperor.  (Meanwhile, as naming taboo for Emperor Min's name, Sima Rui's headquarters Jianye was renamed Jiankang, a name it would keep for several centuries.) When his general Zu Ti requested to lead an army north to, he gave Zu only supplies for one thousand men with no actual troops; Zu had to seek out his own soldiers, but was eventually able to recover a number of cities south of the Yellow River.

In 316, Chang'an fell to Han Zhao forces, and Emperor Min was captured.  Sima Rui quickly declared that he was going to act against Han Zhao, but then quickly claimed a lack of supplies and cancelled the campaign.  In spring 317, his officials requested that he take the throne, and after he declined initially, he took the title "King of Jin"—a title previously used by Sima Zhao while regent of Cao Wei—rather than emperor.  He created his son Sima Shao crown prince.

Early reign and the loss of Northern China 
In early 318, Han Zhao's emperor Liu Cong executed Emperor Min, and three months later, news arrived in Jiankang.  Sima Rui then declared himself emperor (as Emperor Yuan).  At this time, the areas directly under his control were roughly south of the Yellow River and east of the Three Gorges, although pockets of Jin territory in the north—chief among which was Youzhou (modern Beijing, Tianjin, and northern Hebei), controlled by the ethnic Xianbei governor Duan Pidi—largely also recognized him as emperor.  However, while technically recognizing him as emperor, Zhang Shi the governor of Liang Province (modern central and western Gansu), chose not to use his era names and instead continued to use Emperor Min's era name of Jianxing—thus hinting non-recognition. (Also, he did not recognize and was non-committal to Sima Bao the Prince of Nanyang's claim for emperor despite his alliance with his father Zhang Gui and whose domain was closely related to the Zhangs, believing Emperor Yuan would be a more effective emperor but retaining Emperor Min's era name—thus showing another sign that the Zhangs sought independence from the Jin, though not immediately at the time.)

Late in 318, when the Han Zhao emperor Liu Can was overthrown by his official Jin Zhun, Jin Zhun initially indicated that he was submitting to Emperor Yuan's authority, and Emperor Yuan tried to take advantage by sending an army to assist Jin Zhun. However, long before the army could get there, Jin Zhun was defeated by the new Han Zhao emperor Liu Yao and the general Shi Le.

In 319, Duan Pidi's forces fell to Shi Le (who had by that point declared independence from Former Zhao as declared by Liu Yao, establishing Later Zhao in the same year) and Duan fled to another governor still loyal to Jin—Shao Xu the governor of Ji Province (冀州, modern central Hebei). In the next year, Shi Le sent his generals Shi Hu and Kong Chang to capture Shao. They captured him but Duan Pidi was able to take control of Shao's forces, thus once again leading the resistance in the north. While this is happening, remaining Jin resistance around west of Chang'an (or Northwest China, in this area Emperor Yuan has no control of these forces—instead this is where Zhang Shi (who technically recognized the emperor) has more control) began to falter as they entered internal conflict. Meanwhile Sima Bao (who had by then declared himself as Prince of Jin in previous year, ostensibly following the steps of Sima Zhao and did not recognize the emperor by this point) apparently suffering famine and facing Former Zhao invasion, tried to escape to Zhang Shi's domain but was denied by the force Zhang Shi sent to 'protect' him but whose orders were actually to prevent Sima Bao from entering his domain. Failing to rescue himself, he presumably faced resistance by remaining generals under him Yang Tao and Chen An (which had by this point defected to Han Zhao, but bearing some loyalty to him) and was soon apparently murdered by his generals Zhang Chun and Yang Ci, replacing him with his relative Sima Zhan (since Sima Bao had no sons). Soon after, Former Zhao forces led by Chen An attacked Sima Zhan's domain in revenge, killing him and in turn killing Zhang and capturing Yang, ending Jin resistance in the Qin Province. Later in the same year, Zhang Shi was assassinated by his guards Yan She and Zhao Ang, acting from the rumors spread by the magician Liu Hong. His brother and successor Zhang Mao (because Zhang Shi's son is still young at the time) executed Liu Hong and declared general pardon, effectively declaring his domain independent from the Jin, (because general pardon are the powers that was reserved for emperors, not the governor. Additionally, Zhang Mao began to use different era name Yongguang internally, while using Jianxing as an era name to communicate with other states, another definitive evidence that Zhang Mao's domain is effectively independent from the Jin) though he still continues to refer himself as Governor of the Liang Province. This action completely ended Jin rule in the Northwest China as his domain would continue evolving into the vacillating state of Former Liang, especially by the time Zhang Jun ruled the state. By 321, Shao Xu's forces finally collapsed and Duan Pidi was captured by Shi Le, ending his resistance and all resemblance of Jin rule in China north of the Yellow River—although the Xianbei chief Murong Hui the Duke of Liaodong was still in control of modern Liaoning and still considered himself a Jin vassal.

Late reign and confrontation with Wang Dun 
By 320, Emperor Yuan's relationship with Wang Dun was at a breaking point, as Wang Dun had grown more and more arrogant and controlling of the western provinces.  Emperor Yuan feared him, and therefore began to group men around him who were against Wang Dun as well, such as Liu Huai and Diao Xie -- men of mixed reputation who, in their efforts to suppress the Wangs' power offended many other people.  In 321, Emperor Yuan commissioned Dai Yuan and Liu with substantial forces, claiming that they were to defend against Later Zhao attacks, but instead was intending to have them defend against a potential Wang Dun attack. (The general who had a charge of protecting Later Zhao attacks actually remain held by Zu Ti (by this time, he was a governor of Yu Province under Jin). Zu Ti is popular with the people he governed and was successful at holding his gains and attacks from Later Zhao (e.g. Shi Le sent Shi Hu against him in 317, but Zu was able to hold off. In another example next year, Chen Chuan defected and Zu was defeated but Shi was not able to advance further. In the end, this led into a stalemate, then informal detenté in which peace and trade relations are instituted with Yellow River as the border) When Zu Ti died, there is no one on the Jin checking the Later Zhao expansion against Jin. Because after Zu Ti died Chinese power left in the region often vacillated between Jin and Zhaos, these are Cao Ni (renegade general who ruled Qing Province) and Xu Kan (the only general who finally ended up surrendering to Jin). Both two often had a history of conflicts with the Jin, and both was defeated very quickly by Shi Hu, Later Zhao general. Because of these reasons, Jin was unable to do with these territories and gradually lost these territories between Yellow River and Huai River. By the time Cao Ni died, it is likely that Jin does not have any of these territories left thus losing it for decades until recovery by Huan Wen during Emperor Mu of Jin).

In spring 322, Wang Dun started his campaign against Emperor Yuan, claiming that Emperor Yuan was being deluded by Liu and Diao, and that his only intent was to clean up the government.  He tried to persuade Gan Zhuo, the governor of Liang Province (梁州, then consisting of modern northwestern Hubei and southeastern Shaanxi) and Sima Cheng the governor of Xiang Province to join him, and while both resisted, neither was effective in their campaigns against his rear guards.  Wang quickly arrived in Jiankang, defeating Emperor Yuan's forces and entering and pillaging Jiankang easily.  Liu fled to Later Zhao, while Diao, Dai, and Zhou Yi were killed.  Emperor Yuan was forced to submit and grant Wang Dun additional powers in the west.  Wang Dun, satisfied, allowed Emperor Yuan to remain on the throne, and personally withdrew back to his home base of Wuchang (武昌, in modern Ezhou, Hubei).  His forces then defeated and killed Sima Cheng, while a subordinate of Gan's, acting on Wang's orders, assassinated Gan.

After his defeat, Emperor Yuan grew despondent and ill, and died in January 323. Crown Prince Shao succeeded to the throne as Emperor Ming.

Era names 
 Jianwu (建武, jiàn wǔ): 6 April 317 – 26 April 318
 Taixing (太興, tài xīng): 26 April 318 – 3 February 322
 Yongchang (永昌, yǒng chāng): 3 February 322 – 22 April 323

Family
Consorts and Issue:
 Empress Yuanjing, of the Yu clan (277–312), personal name Mengmu
 Empress Dowager Jianwenxuan, of the Zheng clan of Xingyang (d. 326), personal name Achun
 Sima Huan, Prince Dao of Langxie (317–318), fifth son
 Sima Yu, Emperor Jianwen (320–372), sixth son
 Princess Xunyang (b. 323)
 Married Xun Xian of Yingchuan (322–359) in 336
 Jieyu, of the Shi clan
 Sima Chong, Prince Ai of Donghai (311–341), third son
 Cairen, of the Wang clan
 Sima Xi, Prince Wei of Wuling (316–381), fourth son
 Lady, of the Xun clan (d. 335)
 Sima Shao, Emperor Ming (299–325), first son
 Sima Pou, Prince Xiao of Langxie (300–317), second son

Ancestry

References

Citations

Sources 

 Book of Jin, vol. 6.
 Zizhi Tongjian, vols. 85, 86, 87, 88, 89, 90, 91.

276 births
323 deaths
Jin dynasty (266–420) emperors
4th-century Chinese monarchs
Emperors from Luoyang
Burials in Nanjing
Founding monarchs